Edmond J. Safra (6 August 1932 – 3 December 1999) was a Lebanese-Brazilian banker who continued the family tradition of banking in Brazil and Switzerland. He was married to Lily Watkins from 1976 until his death. He died in a fire that attracted wide media interest, and was judicially determined to be due to arson.

Biography
The Safra family came from Beirut, Lebanon and is of Sephardic Jewish background originally from Lebanon and Aleppo.  Edmond's  father, Jacob Safra, had opened the J. E. Safra Bank in 1920 in Beirut and in 1929 it became the Banque Jacob E. Safra which in 1956 changed its name to Banque de Credit National S.A.L. (BCN). By the time he was sixteen, Edmond Safra was working at his father's bank in Beirut, engaged in the precious metals and foreign exchange aspects of the business.

In 1949, the family moved from Lebanon to Italy, where he worked for a trading company in Milan. When he was 16, he earned $40 million during arbitrage transactions between Italian and British gold sovereigns and used this money to obtain a financial house in Geneva which became his Trade Development Bank which used only ancient Arabic script for its bookkeeping. The family moved again in 1952, this time to Brazil, where Edmond Safra and his father founded their first Brazilian financial institution in 1955. He never made Israel his residence.

Career in banking 
In 1956, Edmond Safra settled in Geneva to set up a private bank, the Trade Development Bank, which grew from an original US$1 million to US$5 billion during the 1980s. He extended his financial empire to satisfy his wealthy clients from around the world. He also founded the Republic National Bank of New York in 1966, and, later, Republic National Bank of New York (Suisse) in Geneva. The Republic Bank operated 80 branches in the New York area, making it the number three branch network in the metropolitan region behind Citigroup and Chase Manhattan.

Safra's banking interests served clients in Monaco, Luxembourg and Switzerland.

From 1980 until Safra's death, Walter Weiner was Safra's attorney and CEO of Republic National Bank of New York and, in 1983, Weiner became chairman of the bank.

The sale of Trade Development Bank to American Express for more than US$450 million in 1983, turned into a legal battle between the two parties. The financier came out on top, winning a public apology from American Express for starting a smear campaign against him and US$8 million in damages, all of which he donated to charities.

In 1988, he also founded Safra Republic Holdings S.A., a Luxembourg bank holding company.

By the early 1990s, Safra's fortune was an estimated at US$2.5 billion. He was a major philanthropist during his lifetime, and he left his wealth to the Edmond J. Safra Philanthropic Foundation which supports hundreds of projects in fifty countries around the world in the areas of education, science and medicine, religion, culture and humanitarian assistance.

In 1996 Safra co-founded Hermitage Capital Management with Beny Steinmetz and Bill Browder. The hedge fund became one of the most important investment companies in Russia and later became famous in connection with the Sergei Magnitsky affair.

On 17 August 1998, Safra's Republic National Bank of New York lost 45% of its net income due its large holding of Russian bonds after the 1998 Russian financial crisis.

In 1998, Safra's bank alerted the FBI and the Swiss justice about a possible money laundering scheme involving IMF money, the Republic National Bank of New York and the Republic National Bank of New York (Suisse), some other unidentified outlets, and Russian officials of both the Russian Ministry of Finance and the Russian Central Bank. The IMF funds, which Italian newspaper la Repubblica estimated at $21.4 billion, are said to have caused the Russian financial crisis of 1998.

Later life and death 
As he approached his 60s, Safra divided his time between his homes in Monaco, Geneva, and New York City and the Villa Leopolda on the French Riviera. Weakened by Parkinson's disease, he required nursing care.

On 2 December 1999, Edmond and Lily Safra gained Monegasque citizenship.

In 1999, he sold his Safra Republic Holdings and Republic New York Corporation to HSBC for $10.3 billion in cash. On 31 December 1999, HSBC Private Bank became the new name for Safra's former holdings.

In December 1999, Safra and nurse Vivian Torrente were suffocated by fumes in a fire deliberately lit at the billionaire's Monaco home, where he apparently felt so safe that he did not have his bodyguards stay the night. On the night of the fire, Daniel Serdet, the attorney general and chief prosecutor of Monaco, stated that Samuel Cohen, Safra's personal security chief, stated that no security guards were needed.
Safra's nurse Ted Maher was arrested under suspicion of starting the fire in order to gain attention "through a daring rescue", and then losing control unintentionally. He was convicted of the crime and sentenced to 10 years in prison.

Edmond Safra left 50% of his assets to several charities.

Philanthropic activities
Safra supported educational, religious, medical, cultural, and humanitarian causes and organizations around the world. The Edmond J. Safra Philanthropic Foundation carries on this work in his memory.

Emergency relief 
In April 1992, the Syrian regime dropped the travel restrictions on Jews. Edmond Safra, whose family had old ties with the city of Aleppo, offered to transfer 4,500 Syrian Jews by plane and financed their settling in Brooklyn.

Supporting faith 
Committed to his Jewish faith, he believed that constructing and renovating synagogues was important in places where there was a potential for a Jewish community to flourish, and synagogues around the world bearing his father's name testify to this commitment. Many of these were built in the world's major Jewish centers, but he also helped to build synagogues in more remote communities such as Manila and Kinshasa.

500 years after the last synagogue was built in Madrid he constructed a new one. He also helped to renovate and enlarge synagogues in Amsterdam, Istanbul, Naples, Budapest, Rhodes, and Vienna. He saved the oldest synagogue in France, in Clermont-Ferrand, from destruction by buying it for the community, and he contributed to the expansion of the Cannes synagogue and Synagogue Beth El in Paris. He also helped refurbish synagogues in many small French cities including Évian, Annemasse, and others. Among the synagogues is the Edmond J. Safra Synagogue in New York City.

In addition to supporting a number of synagogues in Israel, the tombs of Rabbi Meir Baal Haness and Rabbi Shimon Bar Yohai (2nd century CE) were especially important to him, and he was a generous supporter of these pilgrimage sites. For many years on Shavuot eve, the anniversary of his father's death, he would pray at the tomb of Rabbi Meir until dawn.

Enhance healthcare and finance medical research 
During his lifetime, Safra donated millions of dollars to provide treatment for the sick. Hospitals across the globe – the Hôpital Cantonal de Genève, the Hôpitaux de France, and countless institutions in the United States, for example – benefited from his generosity. He was one of the founders of Albert Einstein Hospital in São Paulo, today one of South America's major medical centers. In Israel, he initiated the construction of the Edmond and Lily Safra Children's Hospital at the Tel Hashomer hospital complex.

In the area of medical research, he was a significant supporter of the Institut Pasteur in Paris, the Weizmann Institute in Israel, the Michael J. Fox Foundation for Parkinson's Research and a number of different centers studying specific diseases in France, the United States, and elsewhere around the world. He created the Edmond and Lily Safra Chair in Breast Cancer Research at Tulane University.

In France, the Edmond J. Safra Foundation financially supports Clinatec.

Improve education 
Safra believed higher education was essential for every young person in the modern world, even though he himself never attended university. He provided university scholarship funds for tens of thousands of needy students through the International Sephardic Education Foundation (ISEF), an institution he and his wife established in 1977 to support deserving Israeli students.

Safra also helped universities directly, often through the support of chairs and particular programs (such as Judaic Studies). For example, at Harvard University he endowed the Jacob E. Safra Professorship of Jewish History and Sephardic Civilization, and the Edmond J. Safra Center for Ethics; and he gave significant funds for the Robert F. Kennedy Visiting Professorship in Latin American Studies. At the University of Pennsylvania's Wharton School of Business, he created the Jacob E. Safra Professorship of International Banking and the Safra Business Research Center.

He was awarded Honorary Doctorates by the Hebrew University of Jerusalem and Yeshiva University (New York) (where he established the Jacob E. Safra Institute of Sephardic Studies) for his ongoing support of those institutions.

With respect to younger children's education, he was especially devoted to schools in the cities where he lived – for example, he founded Ecole Girsa, Geneva's first and largest Jewish school. He took great pride in founding the Beit Yaacov school in Bat Yam. He was also one of the world's most significant benefactors of yeshivot (religious schools training young men to be rabbis, Jewish teachers, and judges), assisting numerous institutions worldwide.

Honors
Recognized for his philanthropy, Safra received a few official honors:
 Commandeur de l'Ordre des Arts et Lettres and Chevalier de la Légion d'Honneur by the French government,
 Commander of the Order of Merit of the Grand Duchy of Luxembourg, 
 Commander of the Order of Rio Branco by the government of Brazil.

Further reading: Biographies
 Daniel Gross, A Banker's Journey: How Edmond J. Safra Built a Global Financial Empire, New York: Radius, 2022. .
 Bryan Burrough, Vendetta: American Express and the Smearing of Edmond Safra, New York: HarperCollins, 1992. .

See also 
 Edmond & Lily Safra Center for Ethics
 Clinatec
 Grand Théâtre de Genève
 Courtauld Institute of Art

Notes

References

External links
 Edmond J. Safra Philanthropic Foundation
 CBS News 48 Hours Mystery Murder in Monaco
 Extensive Court TV coverage of Safra's death
 Safra Synagogue Directory

1932 births
1999 deaths
20th-century Sephardi Jews
Brazilian bankers
Brazilian billionaires
Brazilian expatriates in Monaco
Arson in Monaco
Brazilian expatriates in Switzerland
Brazilian Sephardi Jews
Brazilian people of Lebanese-Jewish descent
Brazilian people murdered abroad
Harvard University people
Jewish philanthropists
Lebanese emigrants to Brazil
Lebanese Jews
Mizrahi Jews
Naturalized citizens of Brazil
Businesspeople from Beirut
People with Parkinson's disease
Safra family
20th-century philanthropists
Lebanese bankers
Jewish bankers
People murdered in Monaco
Arson deaths